Norman Westbrook (25 June 1868 – 29 May 1931) was an Australian cricketer. He played six first-class matches for Tasmania between 1893 and 1909.

See also
 List of Tasmanian representative cricketers

References

External links
 

1868 births
1931 deaths
Australian cricketers
Tasmania cricketers
Cricketers from Launceston, Tasmania